The list of provincial parks of the Mainland British Columbia Coast contains the provincial parks located within this geographic region of the province of British Columbia. It includes parks from the eight regional districts of Central Coast, Kitimat-Stikine, North Coast, qathet, Squamish-Lillooet, Sunshine Coast, and the mainland portions of Mount Waddington and Strathcona. These parks are administered by BC Parks under the jurisdiction of the Ministry of Environment and Climate Change Strategy.

Parks

Central Coast Regional District

Kitimat-Stikine Regional District

North Coast Regional District

Squamish-Lillooet Regional District

Sunshine Coast Regional District

External links 

Map of provincial parks on the Mainland British Columbia Coast on env.gov.bc.ca

 
Provincial parks
British Columbia, Mainland British Columbia Coast